The 2018 Princess Auto Elite 10 was held from September 26 to 30 at St. Clair Campus Arena in Chatham, Ontario. It was the first Grand Slam of Curling event held in the 2018-19 curling season, and the first time the Elite 10 had a women's division. It was also the last time the event was held, as it was removed from the Grand Slam lineup for the 2019-20 curling season.

On the men's side, defending champions Brad Gushue won the event, their eleventh grand slam, beating out the new Reid Carruthers rink 1 UP in the final.

On the women's side, Olympic champion team Anna Hasselborg won their first grand slam event. They defeated team Silvana Tirinzoni 4-and-2, who were looking for their second ever grand slam victory.

Format
Instead of normal curling scoring rules, the Elite 10 uses a match play system in which scoring is based on ends won, rather than rocks scored. An end is won by stealing or scoring two with the hammer, similar to skins curling. Unlike skins, however, there are no carry-overs. In the event of a tie, a draw to the button competition is held to determine the winner. In the standings, wins are worth three points, draw to the button wins are worth two points, and draw to the button losses are worth one point. At the end of the round robin, the top six teams (regardless of pool) advance to the playoffs, with the top two advancing to the semifinals automatically.

Qualification
The top 10 men's and women's teams in the World Curling Tour's Order of Merit rankings as of August 1, 2018 were invited to compete in the Elite 10. If any teams declined, the next highest team was invited until the field of 10 teams was complete.

Men
Top Order of Merit men's teams as of August 1:
 Brad Gushue
 Niklas Edin
 Kevin Koe
 Bruce Mouat
 Jason Gunnlaugson
 Reid Carruthers
 Brad Jacobs
 Brendan Bottcher
 Peter de Cruz
 John Epping
 Glenn Howard
 Steffen Walstad
 John Shuster
 Thomas Ulsrud
 Kim Chang-min
 Ross Paterson

Women
Top Order of Merit women's teams as of August 1:
 Jennifer Jones
 Anna Hasselborg
 Rachel Homan
 Eve Muirhead
 Tracy Fleury
 Laura Walker
 Kim Eun-jung
 Nina Roth
 Jamie Sinclair
 Satsuki Fujisawa
 Chelsea Carey
 Silvana Tirinzoni
 Casey Scheidegger

Men

Teams

Round-robin standings

Round-robin results
All draw times are listed in Eastern Daylight time (UTC-4).

Draw 1
Wednesday, September 26, 7:00 pm

Draw 2
Thursday, September 27, 8:30 am

Draw 3
Thursday, September 27, 12:00 pm

Draw 4
Thursday, September 27, 4:00 pm

Draw 5
Thursday, September 27, 8:00 pm

Draw 6
Friday, September 28, 8:30 am

Draw 7
Friday, September 28, 12:00 pm

Draw 9
Friday, September 28, 8:00 pm

Playoffs

Quarterfinals
Saturday, September 29, 4:00 pm

Semifinals
Saturday, September 29, 8:00 pm

Final
Sunday, September 30, 4:00 pm

Women

Teams

Round-robin standings

Round-robin results
All draw times are listed in Eastern Daylight time (UTC-4).

Draw 1
Wednesday, September 26, 7:00 pm

Draw 2
Thursday, September 27, 8:30 am

Draw 3
Thursday, September 27, 12:00 pm

Draw 5
Thursday, September 27, 8:00 pm

Draw 6
Friday, September 28, 8:30 am

Draw 7
Friday, September 28, 12:00 pm

Draw 8
Friday, September 28, 4:00 pm

Playoffs

Quarterfinals
Saturday, September 29, 12:00 pm

Semifinals
Saturday, September 29, 8:00 pm

Final
Sunday, September 30, 12:00 pm

References

External links

2018 in Canadian curling
2018 in Ontario
September 2018 sports events in Canada
Chatham-Kent
Curling in Ontario